Cuba is an unincorporated community in Barnes County, North Dakota, United States.

References

Unincorporated communities in Barnes County, North Dakota
Unincorporated communities in North Dakota